Rauan Talgatuly Orynbasar (born 1 March 1998) is a Kazakhstani footballer who plays as a centre-back or defensive midfielder. He made one appearance for the Kazakhstan national team in 2019.

Career 
Orynbasar made his international debut for Kazakhstan national team on 21 February 2019 in a friendly international match against Moldova, which finished as 1–0 victory for Kazakhstan.

References

External links 
 
 

1998 births
Living people
Kazakhstani footballers
Association football central defenders
Association football midfielders
Kazakhstan international footballers
Kazakhstan youth international footballers
Kazakhstan under-21 international footballers
FC Zhetysu players
People from Taldykorgan